"Sugar Free" is a song from Australian pop group Wa Wa Nee. The song was released in December 1986 as the third single from their self-titled debut studio album. The song peaked at number 10 on the Australian singles chart, and number 35 in the US on the Billboard Hot 100.

The song is featured in the film, Cassandra.

The song was covered in Cantonese by Leslie Cheung 'Side Face'（側面）in 1989, recorded on the album Leslie '89

Track listing
7" (CBS – BA3516)
Side A "Sugar Free" – 4:27
Side B "Wild Days and Windy Nights" – 2:59

12"' (CBS – BA12233)
Side A "Sugar Free" (Dance Mix) – 7:08
Side B "Sugar Free" ((The Spanking Dub Mix) – 3:50
Side B "Wild Days and Windy Nights" – 2:59

Charts

Weekly charts

Year-end charts

References 

1985 songs
1986 singles
Wa Wa Nee songs
Songs written by Paul Gray (songwriter)
CBS Records singles